Heitor Almeida is a Brazilian economist, focusing on mergers and acquisitions, financial constraints, international corporate finance, liquidity management, business groups, financial distress, corporate governance, and managerial decision-making. He is currently the Professor of Finance and Stanley C. and Joan J. Golder Chair in Corporate Finance at the University of Illinois.

References

University of Illinois faculty
21st-century American economists
Living people
University of Chicago alumni
Year of birth missing (living people)